Hart County High School is a four-year public comprehensive high school located in Hartwell, Georgia, United States, serving the students of Hartwell and Hart County.  They are known as the home of the Bulldogs.

Notable alumni 
 Eddie McCurley (Class of 1976) – former women's basketball coach at Anderson College and Gardner-Webb University; four-time State Champion girls' basketball coach at Hart County, NJCAA National Championship Tournament 1993 (Final Four), 1994; Division II NCAA tournament 1995, 1996
 Tracy Sadler (Class of 1993) – All-American NJCAA, played for University of North Carolina; Miss Georgia basketball 1993; AAA Player of the year all four years; won the state championship 90-93' featured in Sports Illustrateds "Faces In the Crowd"
 Jae Thaxton (Class of 2004) – Former CFL player for the Calgary Stampeders

References

External links 
Hart County High School
Hart County School System

Public high schools in Georgia (U.S. state)
Schools in Hart County, Georgia
Hartwell, Georgia